Hat Peak is a summit in the U.S. state of Nevada.

Hat Peak was so named on account of its hat-shaped outline.

References

Mountains of Nye County, Nevada